Robert Bigger Oakley (March 12, 1931 – December 10, 2014) was an American diplomat whose 34-year career (1957–1991) as a Foreign Service Officer included appointments as United States Ambassador to Zaire, Somalia, and Pakistan and, in the early 1990s, as a special envoy during the American involvement in Somalia.

Department of State
Born in Dallas, Texas, Oakley graduated in 1948 from Connecticut's South Kent School and spent four years as an Intelligence Officer in the US Navy. He joined the Foreign Service in 1957 and was assigned to the Sudanese capital, Khartoum, in 1958. He first served in the Office of United Nations Political Affairs, Department of State, and later served in American embassies in Abidjan, Saigon, Paris, and Beirut. He also served at the U.S. Mission to the United Nations, and as Senior Director for Middle East and South Asia on the staff of the National Security Council.

In February 1977, he became Deputy to the Assistant Secretary of State for East Asia and Pacific Affairs. He became U.S. Ambassador to Zaire in November 1979 and U.S. Ambassador to Somalia in August 1982. In September 1984, he was appointed Director of the State Department Office of Combating Terrorism. He again joined the National Security Council Staff on January 1, 1987, as Assistant to the President for Middle East and South Asia. 

He was named as U.S. Ambassador to Pakistan in August 1988, succeeding Arnold Lewis Raphel, who was killed in an August 17 airplane crash along with Pakistan's President, Muhammad Zia-ul-Haq. Oakley spent this role supporting Benazir Bhutto's new democratic government after the 1988 general election and coordinating operations between the Central Intelligence Agency and the Inter-Services Intelligence in the Afghanistan conflict. However, he also took office at a time when U.S.-Pakistan relations were becoming strained over the Pakistani nuclear weapons program, which Oakley believed was being used to force concessions from the United States, and a cut-off in U.S. aid to Pakistan because of the invocation of the Pressler Amendment.  

After retiring from the Foreign Service in September 1991, Oakley became associated with the United States Institute of Peace. In December 1992, he was named by President George H. W. Bush as Special Envoy for Somalia, serving there with Operation Restore Hope until March 1993. In October 1993, he was again named as Special Envoy for Somalia by President Bill Clinton, and served in this capacity until March 1994. In January 1995, he joined the Institute for National Strategic Studies at the National Defense University. In 2000, prior to the September 11 attacks, Paul Bremer characterized the Clinton administration as "correctly focused on bin Laden", while Oakley criticized their "obsession with Osama".

Recognitions
During his service with the State Department, Oakley received numerous State Department awards, including: the State Department Meritorious Honor Award, four Presidential Meritorious Service Awards, and the State Department Distinguished Honor Award. For his service as Special Envoy to Somalia, he received a second State Department Distinguished Honor Award and the Department of Defense Medal for Distinguished Public Service. On June 18, 1993, he received the Diplomatic Award for Excellence of the American Academy of Diplomacy. In October 2008, Oakley was awarded a Lifetime Achievement Award from Princeton in Africa.

Family
In Cairo, during June 1958, Oakley married fellow Foreign Service Officer Phyllis Elliott who, under then-prevailing rules, was obliged to resign. The Oakleys have two children, and five grandchildren. Phyllis E. Oakley returned to the Foreign Service in 1974.

Death
Oakley died in McLean, Virginia from complications from Parkinson's disease, on December 10, 2014, aged 83.

References

External links

 The Foreign Affairs Oral History Collection of the Association for Diplomatic Studies and Training; Interview of Robert B. Oakley by Charles Kennedy and Thomas Stern; July 7, 1992. PDF.

Note: When consulted on June 12, 2016, both of the below links were no longer active. 
Adapted from: State Department biography (public domain)
Mississippi State University: Biography of Robert B. Oakley

Ambassadors of the United States to Somalia
Ambassadors of the United States to Pakistan
Ambassadors of the United States to the Democratic Republic of the Congo
2014 deaths
1931 births
South Kent School alumni
Military personnel from Dallas
Virginia Republicans
United States Foreign Service personnel